Heat shock protein beta-8 is a protein that in humans is encoded by the HSPB8 gene.

Interactions 

HSPB8 has been shown to interact with:
 HSPB2, and
 Hsp27.

Clinical importance

Mutations in this gene have been associated with an autosomal dominant rimmed vacuolar myopathy The clinical features of this condition are distal and proximal myopathy. MRI show severe relatively symmetric multifocal fatty degenerative changes within the muscles. Muscle biopsy shows rimmed vacuoles, muscle fiber atrophy and endomysial fibrosis.

References

Further reading

External links
  GeneReviews/NCBI/NIH/UW entry on Charcot-Marie-Tooth Neuropathy Type 2